Ar-pi-uck-i, also known as Abiaka or Sam Jones, (c. 1760 – c. 1860) was a powerful spiritual alektca (medicine chief) and war chief of the Miccosukee, a Seminole–Muscogee Creek tribe of the Southeast United States. Ar-pi-uck-i successfully defied the U.S. government and refused to remove to the Indian Territory west of the Mississippi and his influential leadership in the Second Seminole War (1835–1842) resulted in the permanent Native American presence in Florida.

Name
The phonetic spelling of his name varies to include: Aripeka, Aripeika, Opoica, Arpeika, Abiaka, Apiaka, Apeiaka, Appiaca, Appiacca, Apayaka Hadjo (Crazy Rattlesnake). The name is derivative of the Muscogee word, Abihka, the name of an ancient Muscogee town near the upper Coosa River, meaning "pile at the base" or "heap at the root." The name was conferred on the town because "in the contest for supremacy its warriors heaped up a pile of scalps, covering the base of the war-pole."

Early life
He was born in Georgia.

Treaties
The treaties with the U.S. to which Ar-pi-uck-i was a signatory were Treaty of Payne's Landing (Treaty with the Seminole, 1832), May 9, 1832, and Treaty of Fort Gibson, On The Arkansas River With The Seminole (Treaty with the Seminole, 1833) March 28, 1833 signed by proxy through Tokose Mathla (aka John Hicks), the representative of Ar-pi-uck-i, who traveled to view the proposed relocation lands in the Indian Territory. Signatures were coerced by force of threat. Ar-pi-uck-i was opposed to the relocation.

Second Seminole War, 1835–1842
Battle of Lake Okeechobee – Col. Zachary Taylor led 1032 troops against the Creek and Miccosukee, December 25, 1837, near the mouth of Taylor Creek and Lake Okeechobee and suffered a defeat.  Taylor lost 26 killed and 112 wounded. Ar-pi-uck-i was the leading war chief for the Miccosukee and he carefully formulated and executed his battle plan wisely—entrenched on dry, treed ground, pressing the attack, and losing only 8 (11) and 14 wounded. Then he and his men retired into the swamp. Taylor chose to charge across open water. After the battle Col. Zachary Taylor and the U.S. claimed victory and then fell back a considerable distance towards Tampa. The Battle of Lake Okeechobee was Florida's most significant and bloody battle of the Second Seminole war and a major victory for the Seminoles.

The battlefield was listed in the National Register of Historic Places in the 1960s, later became a National Historic Landmark, and is recognized by the National Trust for Historic Preservation as one of the top endangered historical sites in the U.S.

Battle of Jupiter Inlet – On January 15, 1838, Lt. Levin M. Powell of the U. S. Navy was sent by General Jesup to explore the southwest fork of the Loxahatchee River. Powell's force of fifty-five sailors and twenty-five soldiers engaged Ar-pi-uck-i and his band at Jupiter Inlet. Powell lost five men killed and twenty-two wounded.

Battle of Pine Island Ridge – During the Second Seminole War (1835–1842) in the Battle of Pine Island Ridge, March 22, 1838, Ar-pi-uck-i led an unknown number of Seminoles against 223 Tennessee Volunteer Militia and 38 U.S. regular troops led by Major William Lauderdale. The Battle of Pine Island Ridge, in which the soldiers were forced to attack the Pine Island Ridge hammock through waist deep water while being fired upon from the cover of the island, was a victory for the Seminoles. This battle was U.S. retaliation for the Cooley Massacre of January 6, 1836, in which approximately twenty Seminoles attacked the home of William Cooley in the trading settlement on the New River, which was eight miles distant from the Pine Island Ridge hammock, killing Mrs. Cooley, the Cooley children, and another New River resident Joseph Flinton, the children's tutor. The Seminoles then looted and burned the Cooley farm, but did not attack other New River residents.

In 1841, the year before the close of the Seminole War, Aripeka occupied the region near the mouth of the Kissimmee River and the eastern border of Lake Okeechobee.

Personal life
Arpiucki moved into the area of Big Cypress Swamp after the Third Seminole War of 1855–1858. His band included an estimated 17 warriors and a large number of women and children. He was less effective as a war leader in the Third Seminole War because of advanced age and possible senility.

Ar-pi-uck-i and his half Choctaw, half Irish wife Itee had at least one child: a daughter, Rebecca Jones, born on January 1, 1817.

He died in Florida.

Statues, memorials, and placenames
 A sculpture depicting Ar-pi-uck-i leading the women and children to safety and an exhibit dedicated to Ar-pi-uck-i (Sam Jones, "Abiaka"), on Pine Island Ridge, Tree Tops Park. A copy of this sculpture is also at the Ah-Tah-Thi-Ki Museum at Big Cypress Reservation
 Aripeka, Pasco County, Florida – City named in honor of Ar-pi-uck-i (Sam Jones)
 In a poem published in 1859 he is referred to as Arpeik
 The Ah-Tha-Thi-Ki ("to learn") Museum on the Seminole Big Cypress Reservation is located near to where Abiaca is believed to be buried.
 A bronze Sam Jones group statue which includes Sam Jones, a bear (Bear Clan), panther (Panther Clan), eagle (Bird Clan), rattlesnake (Snake Clan), otter (Otter Clan), toad (Toad Clan), deer (Deer Clan), and Wind Clan is located at the Seminole Big Cypress Reservation. This group statue monument, 1.5 lifesize, is one of the largest bronze in the southeastern U.S.
 A rock outcrop area on Mars called "Seminole". The two targets on this outcrop named "Abiaka" and "Osceola" were probed and studied during the Thanksgiving weekend, 2005, by the Mars Exploration Rover, Spirit

References

External links

 Tree Tops Park
 Ah-Tah-Thi-Ki Museum

1760 births
1860 deaths
Native American leaders
Native Americans of the Seminole Wars
Muscogee people
18th-century Seminole people
19th-century Seminole people
People from Georgia (U.S. state)